Sir Arthur Lionel Pugh Norrington (27 October 1899 – 21 May 1982) was a British publisher, President of Trinity College, Oxford, Vice-Chancellor of Oxford University, and originator of the Norrington Table.

Life
Norrington was born at Normandy Villa, Godstone Road, Kenley, Surrey, England, the only son and eldest child of Arthur James Norrington, a merchant in the City of London, and his wife, Gertrude Sarah Elizabeth, daughter of William Pugh, a merchant from Montgomeryshire. He was a scholar at Winchester College from 1913, where he earned the nickname Thomas because of his scepticism of received lore. In 1918, he enlisted with the Royal Field Artillery and though he did not see active service, he lost a little finger in an accident. In 1919, he matriculated as a scholar to Trinity College, Oxford, achieving a first class in classical Honour Moderations in 1920, followed by a second in Literae Humaniores in 1923.

Moving to London, he worked for the Oxford University Press, who posted him to their branch in India. Returning to Oxford in 1925, he took the post of junior assistant secretary to the Delegates of the Press. He married Edith Joyce Carver on 15 September 1928. Norrington became assistant secretary to the Delegates of Oxford University Press in 1942; in 1948, he took the post of senior administrative officer of the Press and was elected a professorial fellow of Trinity College. Norrington focussed on expanding the range of the Press's educational books, particularly the successful 'Great Wartime Series' Oxford Pamphlets. He was instrumental in expanding the Press' recognition outside Oxford University. Norrington was a keen musician and contributed a great deal to the Press' music publishing as well as being a member of the Oxford Bach Choir, he became chairman of its committee in 1949. His son is the conductor Sir Roger Arthur Carver Norrington, CBE.

In 1952, he was invited to become the next president of Trinity College, which he accepted and took up in 1954. He  took the affairs of the University seriously, both on the council and on the general board. He also held a post on the revising committee for the New English Bible, and in 1960 became the first chairman of the government committee for the publication of cheap books abroad. His name in Oxford is remembered for having devised the Norrington Table, a system of assessing the results of the Oxford colleges in final examinations, the table continues to be compiled and the results published in the national press.

In 1960, Norrington became Vice-Chancellor of Oxford University and proceeded to spend time looking at the status of dons who were not fellows of colleges, and to the future planning of the Science Area. In 1968, he received a knighthood. Edith died at an early age in 1964 and on 9 December 1969 he married a widow, Ruth Margaret Waterlow (née Cude).

Blackwell's bookshop in Broad Street, Oxford created a large room in 1966 under Trinity College land and named it the "Norrington Room" after him. As well as publishing, with professors H. F. Lowry and F. L. Mulhauser, an edition of the poems of Arthur Hugh Clough in 1951, he wrote Blackwell's, 1879–1979: the history of a family firm, published posthumously in 1983. Retiring from Trinity in 1970, he became Warden of Winchester College until 1974. He was made an honorary fellow of Trinity, St Cross College, and Wolfson College. He became an officer of the Légion d'honneur in 1962. Norrington died in the John Radcliffe Hospital, Oxford, on 21 May 1982.

Inspiration for other ranking tables

As well as the Norrington Table, other tables ranking different Oxford colleges have drawn upon Norrington's name, such as the "Vegetarian Norrington Table". First published in 2016, this table ranked the best and worst colleges in Oxford for their vegetarian and vegan food, using data provided by students of the University. The use of Norrington's name in this table was not without controversy, however, and drew criticism from a number of college bursars.

References

1899 births
1982 deaths
People from Kenley
People educated at Winchester College
Alumni of Trinity College, Oxford
English classical scholars
English publishers (people)
Fellows of Trinity College, Oxford
Knights Bachelor
Officiers of the Légion d'honneur
Oxford University Press people
Presidents of Trinity College, Oxford
Vice-Chancellors of the University of Oxford
20th-century English businesspeople